Yong is a farming community and suburb of Tamale in the Tamale Metropolitan District in the Northern Region of Ghana.

See also
Suburbs of Tamale (Ghana) metropolis

References 

Communities in Ghana
Suburbs of Tamale, Ghana